is a former Japanese football player and manager.

Playing career
Takahashi was born in Fukuyama on October 27, 1957. After graduating from Osaka University of Economics, he joined his local club Toyo Industries (later Mazda, Sanfrecce Hiroshima) in 1980. He played regular player as forward and offensive midfielder. Although the club results were bad in Japan Soccer League, won the 2nd place 1987 Emperor's Cup. In 1992, Japan Soccer League was folded and founded new league J1 League. However he could hardly play in the match for injury and retired end of 1993 season.

Coaching career
After retirement, Takahashi started coaching career at Sanfrecce Hiroshima in 1994. In 2000, he moved to Gamba Osaka and became a manager for youth team. In 2003, he returned to Sanfrecce. In 2004, he moved to Yokohama F. Marinos. He served as manager for youth team (2004–06) and coach for top team (2007). In 2008, he moved to Kashiwa Reysol. He served as coach in 2008 and manager in 2009. However the club results were bad in 2009 and he was sacked in July. In 2010, he returned to Sanfrecce again. In 2012, he moved to Tokyo Verdy and became a coach. In September, manager Ryoichi Kawakatsu resigned and Takahashi became new manager as Kawakatsu successor. He resigned end of 2012 season.

Club statistics

Managerial statistics

References

External links
 
 
 biglobe.ne.jp

1957 births
Living people
Osaka University of Economics alumni
Association football people from Hiroshima Prefecture
Japanese footballers
Japan Soccer League players
J1 League players
Sanfrecce Hiroshima players
Japanese football managers
J1 League managers
J2 League managers
Kashiwa Reysol managers
Tokyo Verdy managers
Association football forwards